"Shakedown" is a song recorded by Bob Seger, from the soundtrack of the film Beverly Hills Cop II. The music was written by Harold Faltermeyer, who also wrote the score for the film, and Keith Forsey, with lyrics by Seger. The song became a number-one hit on the Billboard Hot 100, Seger's only such top mark singles-wise, as well as the Album Rock Tracks chart, where it became his second number-one hit, spending four weeks at the top.  In Canada, it went to number one as well, topping the RPM 100 national singles chart on August 1 of the same year.

In 1988, "Shakedown" was nominated for both the Academy Award for Best Original Song and Golden Globe Award for Best Original Song, but it lost both awards to Dirty Dancings "(I've Had) The Time of My Life". At the 60th Academy Awards, "Shakedown" was performed by Little Richard.

History
Initially, Seger's friend and fellow Detroiter, Glenn Frey, was the first choice to record "Shakedown", after having a hit with "The Heat Is On" from Beverly Hills Cop.  Frey did not like the lyrics and then came down with laryngitis, so the song was given to Seger.  After the song went to number one, Frey called to congratulate Seger, saying "At least we kept the money in Michigan!"

Music video
The music video featured scenes from the film intercut with Seger and the band performing it.

Charts

Year-end charts

All-time charts

See also
List of Hot 100 number-one singles of 1987 (U.S.)

References

1987 singles
Bob Seger songs
Billboard Hot 100 number-one singles
Cashbox number-one singles
Songs written by Harold Faltermeyer
Songs written by Bob Seger
Songs written by Keith Forsey
RPM Top Singles number-one singles
1987 songs
MCA Records singles